Cindy Marina (born July 18, 1998) is an Albanian-American model, television presenter, volleyball player, and beauty pageant titleholder who was crowned Miss Universe Albania 2019. She represented Albania in the Miss Universe 2019 competition, placing in the Top 20. Outside of modeling and pageantry, Marina is a setter for the Albania women's national volleyball team, and also played for the USC Trojans women's volleyball team during her studies at the University of Southern California.

Since 2021, Marina has been the presenter for Serie A football matches broadcast in Albania and Kosovo.

Early life and education
Marina was born on July 18, 1998, in Chicago, Illinois to Albanian parents Ardian and Kristina Marina from Shkodër. She was named after Cindy Crawford. Her father played collegiate football in Albania, while her mother was a professional volleyball player in Albania and Italy. She is the second of 3 children and only daughter; her 2 brothers are elder brother Angelo and younger brother Brandon.

When Marina was seven years old, the family moved from Chicago to Temecula, California. She attended Great Oak High School in Temecula, graduating in 2016. After finishing high school, Marina attended Duke University in Durham, North Carolina, but transferred to the University of Southern California in Los Angeles, California for her sophomore year, graduating in 2020. She is a member of the Pi Beta Phi (ΠΒΦ) sorority.

Volleyball
Marina began playing volleyball in her youth. She was a setter on her high school team and played club volleyball at Forza1 where her mom also coached at. In addition, she was a California state nominee for Gatorade Player of the Year in volleyball. After graduating from high school, Marina joined the Duke Blue Devils women's volleyball, and was named to the Atlantic Coast Conference (ACC) All-Freshman Team. For her sophomore year, Marina left Duke and began playing for the USC Trojans women's volleyball team.

Marina joined the Albania women's national volleyball team in 2015, and led the team to a third-place finish in the Silver League during the 2018 Women's European Volleyball League in Hungary. At 17 years old, Marina became the youngest person to ever play for the Albanian national team.

Career

Modeling and pageantry
Marina began modeling at age 14. Her career in modeling began after being recruited by fashion designer Ema Savahl to model her dresses; Savahl is a friend of Marina's mother. She began her pageantry career in 2019, competing in the Miss Universe Albania 2019 competition. She went on to win the competition on June 7, 2019, becoming the first American-born woman to ever win the title, and the second foreign-born to ever win the title, following Kosovo-born Agnesa Vuthaj in 2005.

Marina represented Albania at the Miss Universe 2019 pageant held in Atlanta, Georgia on December 8, 2019, and placed in the top 20. Her reign as Miss Universe Albania ended after she crowned Paula Mehmetukaj as her successor at Miss Universe Albania 2020 on September 18, 2020.

Television
In August 2021, Marina became the official presenter for Serie A football matches broadcast in Albania and Kosovo.

References

External links

1998 births
Albanian beauty pageant winners
Albanian female models
Albanian women television presenters
Albanian women's volleyball players
American beauty pageant winners
American female models
American people of Albanian descent
American women television presenters
Duke University alumni
Female models from California
Female models from Illinois
Living people
Miss Universe 2019 contestants
Models from Chicago
People from Temecula, California
Setters (volleyball)
Sportspeople from California
Sportspeople from Chicago
Sportspeople from Shkodër
University of Southern California alumni
USC Trojans women's volleyball players